The Book of Genesis (2009) is a comic book illustrated by American cartoonist Robert Crumb that purports to be a faithful, literal illustration of the Book of Genesis. It reached #1 the New York Times graphic novel bestseller list and on the Christian books list at Amazon.com.

Given Crumb's past body of work, and his professed rejection of religion, many assumed when the book was announced that it would be a satire or otherwise profane or subversive send-up, and were surprised or disappointed to find it "straight-faced".  Crumb "resist[ed] the temptation to go all-out Crumb on us and exaggerate the sordidness, the primitivism and the outright strangeness" found in the Biblethe depictions of sex are explicit, but not gratuitous. In his introduction to the book, Crumb writes he has "faithfully reproduced every word of the original text," each word hand-lettered. The book's cover contains the warning, "Adult Supervision Recommended for Minors".
 
The book has been controversial, particularly for the explicit illustrations of sexual intercourse described in the text itself. In critical circles, it has drawn fire over whether and how literal the illustration job is, or should be.

Publication history
The book was published by W. W. Norton & Company on October 19, 2009, in book formthe book was never serialized prior to being published.

The publisher wanted to title the book The Book of Genesis According to Robert Crumb, but Crumb insisted on changing "According to" to "Illustrated by".

The book took over four years for Crumb to finish. Holed up in a shepherd's hut in the south of France (where he and his family live), his wife Aline would bring him baskets of food.

Style

Drawing
Drawn in his signature scratchy, obsessively crosshatched drawing style, Crumb avoided doing a satirical or psychedelic take on the work, as would have been expected. Reviewers have called the style "humanizing", with a "human-looking deity" with "enormous, hairy, veiny hands"; unlike much later Christian art, which Europeanized the characters from the Old and New Testaments, the characters in Crumb's book are "plac[ed...] squarely in the Middle East — and populat[ed...] with distinctly Semitic-looking people".

The clothing and sets in the book were based on stills from classic Hollywood movies, as "there's not a lot of documentation about how people dressed and lived in ancient Mesopotamia."

Tone
Crumb originally intended to do a sendup of the Book of Genesis, but "I fooled around in the sketchbooks with those ideas and I just, I didn't like how it was working out so I just decided to do a straight illustration job of it. It seemed to me that the original text was so strange in its own way that there was no need to do any sendup or satire of it. My trial efforts to do that seemed lame, it wasn't working out."

Many reviewers found it surprising that Crumb kept the depictions of sex "tame", given that he is so well known for his explicit depictions of sex.

Crumb's beliefs
Crumb was brought up Catholic, and thus is familiar with the more common Bible stories, but gave up the Catholic faith when he was 16. He went through a phase when he was 15 where he went "to church a lot, receiving communion, saying the Rosary, praying", but when he started to scrutinize it, "it just fell apart so quickly."

Crumb says he is spiritual, gnostic, and not an atheist; he is "interested in pursuing and understanding the spiritual nature of things." He believes there is a God, but "I don't believe [the Book of Genesis is] the Word of God. I believe it's the words of men". He occasionally refers to Ecclesiastes for spiritual guidance, but finds the Book of Genesis to be "much too primitive" to find any spiritual meaning in it.

Sources
Crumb's main source was Robert Alter's translation of the Book of Genesis from 1996, although he referred to other sources, including the King James Version of the Bible. In one passage, Crumb used the "term 'handmaid', derived from the King James, to describe the young woman whom Sarai offers up to sleep with her husband, Abram, after Sarai is unable to conceive, rather than Alter’s term, 'slave girl', which evokes the woman’s subservient status."

Reception and influence
Chester Brown wrote "Robert Crumb is probably the world's greatest living cartoonist, and his The Book of Genesis (2009) might be his masterpiece. It's certainly the best comics adaptation of biblical material that I know of." Brown cited The Book of Genesis as an influence on his own biblical graphic novel, Mary Wept Over the Feet of Jesus.

In 2013 The Book of Genesis was exhibited at the 55th International Venice Art Biennale. Each page of the graphic novel was individually exhibited in uniformed black frames. The audience was invited to follow the sequential images through the large exhibition space; blurring the lines between subversive low-brow comic arts and fine art.

Awards

See also
Chester Brown's Gospel adaptations

Notes

References

Further reading

External links
Product page at W. W. Norton & Company

2009 graphic novels
2009 comics debuts
American graphic novels
Comics by Robert Crumb
Biblical comics
Comics set in ancient Israel
Comics set in ancient Mesopotamia
Comics set in ancient Egypt
Cultural depictions of Adam and Eve
Non-fiction graphic novels
W. W. Norton & Company books